The 1963 Claxton Shield was the 24th annual Claxton Shield, it was held at the Brisbane Cricket Ground and Bannister Park in Brisbane, Queensland. The participants were South Australia, New South Wales, Victoria, Western Australia and Queensland. The series was won by New South Wales claiming their ninth Shield title and first since the 1955 Claxton Shield.

The Helms Award was given to Kevin Cantwell from New South Wales.

Championship Table

References

1963 in baseball
1963 in Australian sport
1963
July 1963 sports events in Australia
August 1963 sports events in Australia